Cliff Bennett and the Rebel Rousers are a 1960s British rhythm and blues, soul and beat group who had two Top 10 hits with "One Way Love" (No. 9 UK, 1964) and "Got to Get You into My Life" (No. 6 UK, 1966).

Well-known members include Bennett himself (vocals, born Clifford Bennett, 4 June 1940, Slough, Berkshire, England) Chas Hodges (keyboards, bass, Mick Burt (drums), Nicky Hopkins (piano) and Moss Groves (tenor saxophone).

Rhythm and blues boom
Bennett formed the band in 1957. They recorded several singles with record producer Joe Meek that were released by Parlophone. Bennett continued recording for Parlophone, issuing cover versions of "You've Really Got a Hold on Me" and "Got My Mojo Working".

Brian Epstein became their manager in September 1964. Their seventh release, "One Way Love" (written by Bert Berns and Jerry Ragovoy under their pseudonyms Bert Russell and Norman Meade) b/w "Slow Down", reached No. 9 in the UK Singles Chart. Their next, "I'll Take You Home" (written by Barry Mann and Cynthia Weil) b/w "Do You Love Him", charted at No. 42. "Three Rooms With Running Water" (written by Jimmy Radcliffe and Bob Halley) did not chart. In early 1966, the band was the opening act for the Beatles on their final European tour.  Bennett got the opportunity to hear the Paul McCartney song "Got to Get You into My Life", which was used on the Revolver album, but was never released as a single. Bennett recorded it, with his own composition "Baby Each Day" appearing on the B-side. McCartney produced the session. The record reached No. 6 on the UK chart, becoming Bennett's biggest ever hit.  Bennett returned to the songbook of McCartney / Lennon in 1968 when he recorded "Back in the USSR" as Cliff Bennett and his Band. Released as a single on Parlophone, it failed to make any impression on the chart.

Also in 1968, The Rebel Rousers left Cliff Bennett and Harvey Hinsley joined the band, which by then included Hodges, Burt, John Golden, Moss Groves and Roy Young. They played gigs in the UK, Germany, Austria, Italy, Beirut and the Bahamas. This version of the band also recorded a single, "Should I," which did not chart. At the end of August 1969, Young left to form his own band. Hodges, Hinsley, Burt and Dave Peacock formed Black Claw, which played club engagements until Hodges left to join Heads, Hands & Feet in early 1970. Hinsley joined Hot Chocolate in late summer 1970.

Afterwards
Bennett went on to be part of Toe Fat, whilst Chas Hodges (keyboards) and Mick Burt became Chas & Dave with Dave Peacock. After Toe Fat disbanded, two of their members (Ken Hensley and Lee Kerslake) joined Uriah Heep,. Bennett was asked to join them but declined. He was also considered for the lead vocalist position in Blood, Sweat & Tears when David Clayton-Thomas left in the early 1970s, but once again turned the position down.

Bennett released a solo album, Rebellion, in 1971 but he was unable to rekindle his success of the previous decade. Between 1975 and 1976 he was the vocalist for a band called Shanghai, which released two albums. Other members included Mick Green (guitar), Chuck Bedford (vocals, harmonica, 1974–75), Pete Kircher (drums, vocals), Mike Le Main (bass, keyboards, 1974–75), Brian Alterman (guitar, 1975–76) and Pat King (bass, 1975–76). In the late 1970s, Bennett retired from the music industry to go into shipping.

In 1988, English guitarist Mark Lundquist reformed The Rebel Rousers. He functioned as both band leader and manager until 1996. More recently, Lundquist has toured alongside Mike d'Abo, Chris Farlowe, Zoot Money, Maggie Bell, Screaming Lord Sutch, The Manfreds, Steve Ellis and New Amen Corner.

Members

Moss Groves – tenor saxophone (born Maurice Groves, 3 April 1940, Birmingham)
Roy Young – piano, organ (born Roy Frederick Young, 20 October 1934, Poplar, East London, England died 27 April 2018, Oxford)
Bobby Thomson – bass (born Robert Thomson, 1942, Liverpool, Lancashire, England)
Frank Allen – bass (born Francis Renauld McNiece, 14 December 1943, Hayes, Middlesex, England)
Chas Hodges – bass (born Charles Nicholas Hodges, 28 December 1943, Edmonton, North London, England died 22 September 2018)
Ben Jordan – bass (born Benjamin Jordan, in 1941, Edmonton, North London, England)
Ricky Winters – drums (born Richard Winters, 27 September 1940, Aldershot, Hampshire, England)
Dave Edmunds – percussion
George Mattingley – Rhythm guitar, early years 1957–1960. Lives in Castle Donington, North Leicestershire.
Dave Wendels – lead guitar (born David Wendels, 5 July 1942, Hounslow, Middlesex, England)
Mick Currell – rhythm guitar (born Michael Currell, 1940)
Bernie Watson – lead guitar (born Bernard Watson, 1944)
Mick King – lead guitar (born Michael Borer, 1942, Croydon, Surrey died 26 November 2010)
Sid Phillips – tenor saxophone (born Bernard Phillips died 18 December 2015)
John Golden – trumpet
Rahsar Nesskrag – triangle
Mick Burt – Drums – (Born Michael William Burt on 23 August 1938 Redhill, Surrey, England, Died 18 October 2014)
Lars Lundquist – lead guitar – (Born Mark Lundquist on 27 July 1954, London, England).
Dave Forristal – Piano and Hammond – (Born Dave Forristal 14 Feb 1973, Fakenham, Norfolk) 2018-2022
Darren Bazzoni - Drums - (Born 20 Dec 1968, England) .

Discography

Singles
July 1961: "You've Got What I Like" / "I'm in Love With You" Parlophone R 4793
October 1961: "That's What I Said" / "When I Get Paid" Parlophone R 4836
March 1962: "Poor Joe" / "Hurtin' Inside" Parlophone R 4895
July 1963: "Everybody Loves A Lover" / "My Old Stand By" Parlophone R 5046
November 1963: "You Really Got A Hold on Me" / "Alright" Parlophone
March 1964: "Got My Mojo Working" / "Beautiful Dreamer" Parlophone R 5119
September 1964: "One Way Love" / "Slow Down Parlophone" R 5173 UK#9
January 1965: "I'll Take You Home" / "Do You Love Him?" Parlophone R 5229 UK#42
April 1965: "Three Rooms With Running Water" / "If Only You'd Reply" Parlophone R 5259
August 1965: "I Have Cried My Last Tear" / "As Long As She Looks Like You" Parlophone R 5317
February 1966: "You Can't Love 'Em All" / "Need Your Loving Tonight" Parlophone R 5406
June 1966: "Eyes For You" / "Hold on I'm Coming" Parlophone R 5466
August 1966: "Got To Get You into My Life" / "Baby Each Day" Parlophone R 5489 UK#6
November 1966: "Never Knew Lovin' Could Be So Doggone Good" / "Don't Help Me Out" Parlophone R 5534
February 1967: "I'll Take Good Care of You" / "I'm Sorry" Parlophone R 5565
May 1967: "I'll Be There" / "Use Me"
August 1967: "Good Times" / "Lonely Weekends" Parlophone R 5711

EPs
1964   'She said Yeah'/ 'Doctor Feelgood' / 'You Make Me Happy' / 'Stupidity' GEP 8923
1965: Try It Baby – "I'm Crazy 'Bout My Baby"/"Shoes"/"Try It Baby"/"Do It Right" Parlophone GEP 8936
1966: We're Gonna Make It – "My Sweet Woman"/"Whole Lotta Woman"/"We're Gonna Make It"/"Waiting at the Station" Parlophone GEP 8955

Albums
As Cliff Bennett & the Rebel Rousers
1965: Cliff Bennett & the Rebel Rousers – "I Can't Stand It"/"Sweet And Lovely"/"Make Yourself at Home"/"You've Really Got A Hold on Me"/"Ain't That Lovin' You"/"Sha La La"/"One Way Love"/"Steal Your Heart Away"/"It's Alright"/"Beautiful Dreamer"/"Mercy, Mercy"/"Talking About My Baby"/"The Pick-Up" Parlophone PMC 1242
1966: Drivin' You Wild – "Three Rooms With Running Water"/"Baby, Baby, Baby"/"You Made Me Happy"/"Sweet Sorrow"/"I Have Cried My Last Tear"/"Another Saturday Night"/"Drivin' Me Wild"/"That's Why I Love You So"/"Who Cheatin' Now?"/"I'll Be Doggone"/"Strange Feeling"/"I'll Take You Home" Music For Pleasure MFP 1121
 1967: Got To Get You into Our Life - "It's A Wonder" / "Ain't Love Good, Ain't Love Proud" / "6345-789" / "Roadrunner" / "Baby Each Day" / "Got To Get You into My Life" / "Barefootin'" / "See-Saw" / "I'm Not Tired" / "Stop Her on Sight (S.O.S.)" / "You Don't Know Like I Know" / "C.C. Rider" Parlophone PMC 7017

As Cliff Bennett & His Band
 1968: Cliff Bennett Branches Out - "You're Breaking Me Up" / "Lonely Weekends" / "Ease Me" / "When Something Is Wrong with My Baby" / "Taking Care of a Woman Is a Full Time Job" / "I Don't Need Anybody" / "Close The Door" / "Good Times" / "Said I Weren't Gonna Tell Nobody" / "You're the One For Me" / "Take Your Time" / "I Take What I Want" Parlophone PMC 7054
On bootleg recordings of The Beatles performing at the Star Club in Hamburg, Germany, a performance of "Hully Gully" (recorded the same night as a Beatles set) is often mistakenly included as a Beatles performance.

References

External links
Cliff Bennett and the Rebel Rousers @ 45-rpm.org.uk
Soundsofthe60s.com Mini-biography
 Geocities.com – The British Beat Boom – fan site

Beat groups
Musical groups established in 1957
Musical groups disestablished in the 1970s
British rhythm and blues boom musicians
1957 establishments in the United Kingdom
1970s disestablishments in the United Kingdom